John Vaughan  (1863 – 1952) was a Welsh international footballer. He was part of the Wales national football team between 1885 and 1886, playing four matches and scoring one goal. He played his first match on 11 April 1885, against Ireland, and his last match on 10 April 1886, against Scotland.

See also
 List of Wales international footballers (alphabetical)

References

1863 births
1952 deaths
Welsh footballers
Wales international footballers
Place of birth missing
Date of death missing
Association footballers not categorized by position